United Nations Security Council Resolution 82 was a measure adopted by the United Nations Security Council (UNSC) on June 25, 1950. The resolution condemned the "armed attack on the Republic of Korea by forces from North Korea", while calling for "the immediate cessation of hostilities" and for "the authorities in North Korea to withdraw forthwith their armed forces to the 38th parallel". The measure was adopted by a vote of 9 support, none opposed, and one abstention. The resolution passed since the Soviet Union was boycotting the UN for recognising Republic of China as China.

The Korean Peninsula had been divided between occupation forces of the United States and the Soviet Union since the end of World War II along the 38th Parallel. Each government sought to prop up a government on its side of the occupation border, and as the Cold War began, tensions rose between the two Koreas. These culminated in open warfare with the North's invasion of the South on June 25. During this time, the United Nations backed South Korea and considered it the only lawful government.

The resolution called on the North to immediately halt its invasion and to move its troops back to the 38th parallel. Seen as a diplomatic victory for the United States, the resolution was completely ignored by North Korea. This brought the UN and the US to take further action, setting the state for massive international involvement and the expansion of the Korean War.

Background

Division of Korea 
At the end of World War II, the Korean Peninsula, which up to that point had been occupied by the Empire of Japan, was divided along the 38th Parallel.  To the north, the Soviet Union (USSR) occupied the country, which established itself as a communist state, the Democratic People's Republic of Korea under Kim Il Sung.  To the south, the United States (US) occupied the country, establishing the Republic of Korea under an autocratic anti-communist leader, Syngman Rhee. As tensions rose between the US and the USSR, each government in Korea claimed it had sovereignty over the whole country.

On November 14, 1947, United Nations General Assembly Resolution 112 established a temporary commission to monitor free elections in Korea. The UN had intended to reunify Korea under one government, but the UN commission was unable to enter North Korea. After observing elections in South Korea, the UN stated in General Assembly Resolution 195 on December 12, 1948, that the nation was to be established under one government as soon as possible, and the US and Soviet occupation forces there were to withdraw.

As time went on, the North Korean government became more aggressive, and skirmishes between troops of the North and South became common. UN military observers were assigned to monitor the situation and prevent it from escalating. United Nations General Assembly Resolution 293, passed October 21, 1949, recognized only South Korea's government as legal. For its part, North Korea issued inflammatory responses to the UN denying the legality of UN activities in Korea and saying it would drive the UN out of the country.

Outbreak of war 

On the night of June 25, 1950, ten divisions of the North Korean People's Army launched a full-scale invasion of the Republic of Korea. The force of 89,000 men moved in six columns, catching the Republic of Korea Army by surprise, resulting in a rout. The smaller South Korean army suffered from widespread lack of equipment, and was unprepared for war. The numerically superior North Korean forces overcame  isolated resistance from the 38,000 South Korean soldiers on the frontier before it began moving steadily south. Most of South Korea's forces retreated in the face of the invasion. The North Koreans were well on their way to South Korea's capital of Seoul within hours, forcing the government and its shattered army to retreat further south.

News of the invasion quickly spread around the world via ambassadors and correspondents in Korea. Journalists in the United States were reporting on the invasion within five hours of the initial attack, and United States Ambassador to Korea John J. Muccio sent a telegram to the US State Department at 21:26 EST (10:26 KST) June 24. As the combat grew more intense, US Secretary of State Dean Acheson informed US President Harry S. Truman (who had been resting at his home in Independence, Missouri for the weekend), and Secretary-General of the United Nations Trygve Lie of the situation. The attack was particularly troubling to Truman, who likened it to the Japanese attack on Pearl Harbor, and to Lie, who was reminded of the Invasion of Norway during World War II. Fearing the attack would spur a World War III, Truman resolved to act as quickly as possible to prevent an escalation of the conflict. Muccio met with Rhee, who informed him the South Korean Army would run out of ammunition within ten days, and would not be able to hold back the invasion on its own. He requested the United Nations and the United States assist South Korea in the conflict.

Lie convened the United Nations Security Council (UNSC)  for its 473rd meeting at 14:00 June 25 in New York City, New York. He began the meeting with a detailed report from the UN Commission on Korea, explained the situation to the delegates, and insisted that the UN take action to restore peace in Korea. According to the UN Commission on Korea, the situation was assuming the character of full-scale warfare. Then, US diplomat Ernest A. Gross gave Muccio's report on the situation.

The United States introduced a resolution stating that North Korea's invasion was a breach of peace in violation of Chapter VII of the United Nations Charter. Gross requested that South Korea's ambassador to the United Nations, Chang Myon, be present for the meeting, which was granted. The Yugoslavian delegate requested that a North Korean diplomat be present as well, but this request was not granted. North Korea was not a member of the UN and had no representation in the organization. Myon read a prepared statement calling the invasion a crime against humanity, and said that as the UN had played a major role in the founding of South Korea, it was their responsibility to help defend it from aggression. The UNSC debated the resolution and made amendments and revisions to its wording before passing it.

The Soviet UN ambassador was not present at the UNSC meeting as a result of the Soviet boycott against the UN, rendering the Soviet Union unable to veto resolution 82.

The resolution 

The resolution passed with 9 supports and no opposition. Supporting nations included the United States, the United Kingdom, Republic of China, France, Cuba, Ecuador, Norway, Egypt and India. Aleš Bebler, delegate from Yugoslavia, abstained from voting. The Soviet Union's delegate had boycotted all UN meetings because of procedural disagreements over the permanent security council seat going to the Republic of China (Taiwan) over the People’s Republic of China (Mainland) earlier in the year. Soviet ambassador to the United Nations Yakov Malik had been personally ordered not to attend the UNSC meetings by Soviet Premier Joseph Stalin. Lie was a strong supporter of the resolution, as he saw the conflict as a challenge to the authority of the UN.

Aftermath 
The resolution was seen as a political victory for the United States, as it identified North Korea as the aggressor in the conflict. Earlier in the day, independent of the UN resolution, Truman had ordered the Joint Chiefs of Staff to contact US Army General of the Army Douglas MacArthur, who was in charge of US forces in the Far East. He ordered MacArthur to prepare ships for the evacuation of US citizens from Korea, and authorized him to send ammunition and supplies to Pusan to support South Korean forces in the Seoul-Kimpo area. These would be escorted by US military units.  He instructed MacArthur to send a survey team into the country to assess the situation and determine how to aid South Korea. Truman also ordered the mobilization of the US Navy for movement into the region.

The US delegation later contacted the Soviet delegation and sent a message requesting that the Kremlin use its influence over North Korea to compel it to comply with the resolution, but the Soviet Union denied the request. With the ineffectiveness of the resolution in de-escalating the conflict, the UNSC convened on June 27 to discuss further actions to take, resulting in United Nations Security Council Resolution 83, which recommended military intervention by other UN member nations to restore peace in Korea. Within days, ships and aircraft from several nations, as well as the first major formations of US troops, were moving to South Korea, setting the stage for a full-scale conflict.

In a 2010 column, Colum Lynch of Foreign Policy magazine criticized the resolution as one of the ten worst UN resolutions in history. After the Soviet Union ended its boycott of the council, it used its veto power to block any further resolutions against North Korea. In response, Acheson introduced a new procedure to the UN General Assembly to allow a member state to bypass the UNSC and seek approval in the General Assembly, including recommendations on the use of force, United Nations General Assembly Resolution 377. When this was passed, it allowed for open-ended General Assembly emergency special sessions to address threats to international peace and security for which the UNSC was unable to pass a resolution. Lynch wrote that the creation of this rule caused unintended negative consequences for the United States  in 1997 when several Arab states began the Tenth emergency special session of the United Nations General Assembly to address the Israeli–Palestinian conflict and Israel's occupation of the West Bank and the Gaza Strip. This session, convened as a way around a US veto, spanned 30 meetings over the next ten years, and has never formally been closed.

See also 
List of United Nations Security Council Resolutions 1 to 100 (1946–1953)

References

Citations

Sources

External links
 
Text of the Resolution at undocs.org

 0082
Korean War
Soviet Union and the United Nations
 0082
 0082
1950 in North Korea
1950 in South Korea
1950 in Korea
June 1950 events